Morten Jensen (born 20 September 1987) is a German football goalkeeper, who currently plays for TSV Havelse.

Career
Born in Husum, Jensen joined Hannover 96 in 2003 and established himself as the number one with their amateur side, playing in the Oberliga North. He debuted for the Bundesliga team, when he started in the final day 2–2 draw with Bayer Leverkusen on 13 May 2006. His opportunity arrived after Hannover had loaned out former third choice keeper Daniel Haas to TSG 1899 Hoffenheim. His contract with Hannover 96 expired in the summer of 2010. In July 2010, he signed a contract with Hessen Kassel, before moving to Holstein Kiel a year later.

References

1987 births
Living people
People from Husum
German footballers
Bundesliga players
Hannover 96 players
Hannover 96 II players
Holstein Kiel players
SV Elversberg players
Association football goalkeepers
TSV Havelse players
Footballers from Schleswig-Holstein